Dureji is a town and union council of Hub District  in the Balochistan province of Pakistan. It is located at 25°53'9N 67°18'1E with an altitude of 219 metres.

References

Union councils of Lasbela District
Populated places in Lasbela District